Bhagwan Dada (1 August 1913 – 4 February 2002), also credited and mononymously known as Bhagwan, was an Indian actor and film director who worked in Hindi cinema. He is best known for his social film Albela (1951) and the song "Shola Jo Bhadke".

Early life

Bhagwan Dada was born in 1913 as Bhagwan Abhaji Palav in Amravati, Maharashtra. He was the son of a textile-mill worker who worked in Mumbai textile mills and was obsessed with films. Bhagwan dada hailed from a Marathi family. He worked as labour, but dreamt of films. He got his break with bit roles in silent films and got totally involved with the studios. He learned film-making and at one stage used to make low-budget films (in which he arranged for everything including the design of costumes and arranging meals for the cast) for Rs. 65,000.

Career

Bhagwan Abhaji Palav, popularly known as Bhagwan dada, mainly due to his love for wrestling, made his debut in the silent era with the film Criminal.

He co-directed his first film Bahadur Kisan with Chandrarao Kadam in 1938. From 1938 to 1949 he directed a string of low-budget stunt and action films that were popular with the working classes. He usually played a naive simpleton. One of the notable films that he made during this period was the Tamil film Vana Mohini (1941) that starred M. K. Radha and Sri Lankan actress Thavamani Devi.

In 1942, as part of a scene, he had to slap actress Lalita Pawar hard. He accidentally slapped her too hard, which resulted in facial paralysis and a burst left-eye vein. After three years of treatment, Pawar was left with a disabled left eye.

He turned producer in 1942 with Jagruti Pictures, purchased some land and set up Jagriti Studios in Chembur in 1947. On advice from Raj Kapoor, he turned to making a social film called Albela, starring Bhagwan and Geeta Bali, and featuring music by his friend Chitalkar, or C. Ramchandra. The songs of the film, in particular "Shola jo bhadke" are still remembered. Albela was a huge hit. After Albela, Bhagwan got C. Ramchandra and Geeta Bali together again in Jhamela (1953), where he tried to recreate the formulaic success of Albela with little success. He also directed and acted in Bhagam Bhag in 1956.

Later life
After that, Bhagwan did not have any more hits and eventually had to give up producing and directing films, and sold his 25-room waterfront bungalow in Juhu and his fleet of seven cars (one for each day of the week). He took whatever roles he could get, but apart from Jhanak Jhanak Payal Baje (1955), Chori Chori (1956) and Gateway of India (1957), none were roles of note, and he eventually took on bit parts in which he did his famous dance (made even more famous by Amitabh Bachchan using it as his default dance step).

Most of Bhagwan's associates left him in his time of need, apart from C. Ramchandra, Om Prakash and lyricist Rajinder Krishan, who continued to meet him even in his chawl. Bhagwan died of a massive heart attack at his residence in Dadar on 4 February 2002.

Filmography

In popular culture 
In 2016, a Marathi movie Ekk Albela released which was a biopic of the actor.

References

External links
 

1913 births
2002 deaths
Indian male film actors
Male actors in Hindi cinema
20th-century Indian film directors
Hindi-language film directors
Film directors from Mumbai
20th-century Indian male actors
Male actors from Mumbai